Mountain States Telephone and Telegraph Building or variations may refer to:

 Mountain States Telephone and Telegraph Building (Brigham City, Utah), NRHP-listed in Box Elder County
 Mountain States Telephone and Telegraph Co. Garage, Salt Lake City, Utah, NRHP-listed in Salt Lake City
 Mountain States Telephone and Telegraph Company Building (Meridian, Idaho), NRHP-listed in Ada County
 Mountain States Telephone and Telegraph Company Building (Miles City, Montana), NRHP-listed in Custer County
 Mountain States Telephone and Telegraph Exchange Building (Prescott, Arizona), listed on the National Register of Historic Places (NRHP) in Yavapai County

See also  
Telephone Company Building (disambiguation)